The South Dakota Review (SDR) is a quarterly literary magazine published by the University of South Dakota.

History and profile
SDR was founded in 1963 by John R. Milton and is currently edited by Lee Ann Roripaugh. Past associate editors include Eileen Sullivan and Theo Bohn. Works with a strong sense of place and image are encouraged. The magazine has its headquarters in Vermillion.

SDR publishes poetry, fiction, interview, and literary non-fiction by both emerging and established writers of considerable skill. Recent contributors of note include Philip Heldrich,  Tricia Currans-Sheehan, Jacob M. Appel, Gary Fincke, Eileen Sullivan, and Mark Sanders.

See also
List of literary magazines

References

External links
 South Dakota Review

Literary magazines published in the United States
Quarterly magazines published in the United States
Magazines established in 1963
Magazines published in South Dakota
University of South Dakota